Emmanuel Appiah born (21 August 1987) is a Ghanaian entrepreneur and Chief Executive Officer of Aireceive LLC, a technology company in Ghana. He is known to have developed an app to improve sanitation in Ghana and communicate without the use of internet.

Education 
He is a graduate of University of Mines and Technology where he studied Mechanical Engineering. He also holds a certificate in GSM networking and Architecture from Central Professional Institute, The Loom, Ghana.

Career and life 
He is known for designing a technology, Aireceive, which is a platform that allows you to communicate with people without the use of the internet. The technology which does not require signals from network providers. Aireceive transmits pictures and messages within 250 feet from devices. It has been tested in the University of Mines And Technology.

He has developed an app "Wonelcycler" which aids persons with used empty bottles scan without the use of the internet and get paid. He has provided employment opportunities to vendors that meet at designated locations  and is also improving sanitation in Ghana.

Achievements 
 On August 8, 2019, he received Government funding of GH 20,000.00 out of the requested GH 97,800.00 in the National Entrepreneurship and Innovation Programme (N.E.I.P) towards the development of Aireceive at 10% pay back to the government, with the rest of the funding to be given within the first two years of paying back the first GH 20,000.00 puts the company valuation between GH 200,000.00 and GH 970,000.00.
 His application Wonelcycer came forth as the winners of Winners of Creatives in Augmented Reality Enterprises (CARE) hackathon in September 2018 at Kumasi Hive, Kentinkrono. Wonecyccer emerged as winners because it an Augmented reality app picking teach giving information of its worth in the market. The hackathon saw ten groups pitching their ideas with the first three groups receiving 250 Euros each. The program was organized by Kumasi Hive together with British Council and Department of Communication at Kwame Nkrumah University of Science and Technology with the focus of training participants in Augmented reality.
 The app also came 1st Runner Up in the UNICEF Generation Unlimited Youth Challenge Hackathon with a Cash price of $750.00.
He published a research study on Development of Entrepreneurship through Effective Human Resource Management Practices.

References 

Living people
Ghanaian businesspeople
1987 births
Ghanaian chief executives
Ghanaian business executives